Uppada is a village in East Godavari district of the Indian state of Andhra Pradesh. It is located in Kothapalli mandal of Kakinada revenue division. Uppada Jamdani Sari is a handcrafted sari woven at the village and is also a geographical indication of Andhra Pradesh. It is popular Fishery station for Prawns.

Geography

See also 
Uppada Beach

References

Villages in East Godavari district